Boston Ravine is a former settlement in Nevada County, California.

History

The settlement began in the fall of 1849 with four cabins on the south of a ravine, erected by the Boston Company, led by Rev. H.H. Cummings. By 1853, there were several quartz mills, and later a foundry.

A post office operated at Boston Ravine from 1889 to 1890.

Climate
According to the Köppen Climate Classification system, Boston Ravine has a warm-summer Mediterranean climate, abbreviated "Csa" on climate maps.

References

Former settlements in Nevada County, California
Former populated places in California
Populated places established in 1849
1849 establishments in California